Tennis events were contested at the 1977 Summer Universiade in Sofia, Bulgaria.

Medal summary

Medal table

See also
 Tennis at the Summer Universiade

References
World University Games Tennis on HickokSports.com
  (Men's singles final)
  (Men's singles 3rd place)

1977
Universiade
1977 Summer Universiade